Serjio Robert Livingstone Pohlhammer (26 March 1920 – 11 September 2012), later simply known as Sergio Livingstone, was a Chilean goalkeeper, who later became a well-regarded journalist. He was nicknamed "El Sapo" ("the toad") for his typical posture in the goal. From 1938 to 1959 he played primarily for CD Universidad Católica in Santiago. With Chile he took part in seven Copa América and one FIFA World Cup.

Career
Serjio (later Sergio) Livingstone's family hailed from Scotland. His father , who played for Santiago National, was a pioneer of the game in Chile and his mother, Ana Pohlhammer Caamaño, died when Sergio was 11 years old. Livingstone originally joined Unión Española in 1936, after Luis Tirado watched him in a match between St. Ignatius College, where he studied, and English Institute of Santiago. He abandoned football to study law at the Pontificia Universidad Católica de Chile. Soon he acquainted himself with the university's football team, and from 1938 he began to establish himself as the goalkeeper of CD Universidad Católica.

He debuted in the national team at the 1941 South American Championship which took place in Chile, winning 5–0 against Ecuador. By the end of the tournament Chile ended third, and Livingstone was considered the best player of the tournament. Altogether, Livingstone played between 1941 and 1954 in 52 matches for Chile, which made him the country's record international until 1962, participating in five more South American Championships, totaling 34 matches in this competition, which remains record. He also took part in the FIFA World Cup 1950 in Brazil, where Chile exited after the first group phase.

At club level he spent 1943 in Argentina playing 30 matches for Racing Club. He cut short his time in Argentina for sentimental reasons and rejoined Católica in 1944, winning the national championships of 1949 and 1954. After the second title the club had the misfortune to be relegated in the season immediately thereafter, but managed to return to the first division as quickly. After a brief spell on loan in 1957 with Colo-Colo he once more returned to Universidad Católica where he finished his career in 1959.
Following his football career, he became a well-known sports journalist and television personality with Televisión Nacional de Chile, where he remained until his death (more than 60 years).

Legacy
In 2009, a street in the district of Independencia in Santiago was named for Livingstone.

Honours 
 Championship of Chile: 1949, 1954

References

External links

 
 Claudio Pizarro: "Sergio 'Sapo' Livingstone, un crack de 89 años: "Si jugara ahora, sería farandulero", 18 September 2009, The Clinic
 Jorge Guerrero Cortés: El libro no escrito de Sergio Livingstone 4 June 2010, DOREMIFAGOL

1920 births
2012 deaths
Chilean people of Scottish descent
Chilean people of Austrian descent
Footballers from Santiago
Chilean footballers
Chilean expatriate footballers
Chile international footballers
Chilean Primera División players
Argentine Primera División players
Club Deportivo Universidad Católica footballers
Colo-Colo footballers
Racing Club de Avellaneda footballers
Chilean expatriate sportspeople in Argentina
Expatriate footballers in Argentina
1950 FIFA World Cup players
Chilean television presenters
Chilean association football commentators
Televisión Nacional de Chile color commentators
Chilean sports journalists
Association football goalkeepers